Hawaiian yellow-faced bee is a common name for several Hawaiian species of Hylaeus bee and may refer to:

Hylaeus kuakea
Hylaeus longiceps
Hylaeus mana